Michael Kraus (born September 10, 1984 in Memphis, Tennessee) is an American soccer former player and coach. In 2022 Kraus was hired to be the head coach of Grand Canyon University.

Career

College and Amateur
Kraus played college soccer at Creighton University, where he was named the Missouri Valley Conference Player of the Year in 2006, the same year he served as Creighton's team captain. He was named First-Team All-MVC in 2006 and Second-Team All-MVC in 2005. He was named MVC Offensive Player of the Week four times in his collegiate career.

In 2004, Kraus played with the Memphis Express in the USL Premier Development League in 2004, and played again in the PDL with Des Moines Menace in 2005.

In 2002, Kraus was named Tennessee Player of the Year as a high school senior. He played youth soccer for Memphis Futbol Club for 9 years under Coach Richard Bute.

Professional
Kraus was drafted 48th by the Kansas City Wizards in the 2007 MLS Supplemental Draft. He made his MLS debut against Colorado Rapids on March 28, 2009, coming on as a 67th-minute substitute, and scored his first MLS goal one minute later. Kraus was released by Kansas City on March 23, 2010. (With the waiving of Kraus, the Kansas City Wizards roster was at the 24-player limit required by MLS.)

Honors

Des Moines Menace
USL Premier Development League Champions (1): 2005

Personal
Kraus is fifth youngest of six children. His father is a doctor of internal medicine in Memphis, TN. He majored in psychology at Creighton University. He enjoys watching Seinfeld re-runs and reading books by one of his favorite authors, Greg Iles.

References

External links
 MLS player profile

1984 births
Living people
American soccer players
Soccer players from Tennessee
Creighton Bluejays men's soccer players
Memphis Express (soccer) players
Des Moines Menace players
Sporting Kansas City players
FC Tucson players
USL League Two players
Major League Soccer players
Sporting Kansas City draft picks
Real Salt Lake non-playing staff
Association football midfielders
Association football forwards
Grand Canyon Antelopes men's soccer coaches